The Cars That Ate Paris is a 1974 Australian horror comedy film, produced by twin brothers Hal and Jim McElroy and directed by Peter Weir. It was his first feature film, and was also based on an original story he had written. Shot mostly in the rural town of Sofala, New South Wales, the film is set in the fictional town of Paris in which most of the inhabitants appear to be directly, or indirectly, involved in profiting from the results of car accidents.

Plot
The film begins with an urban couple driving through the countryside in what looks like a cinema advertisement. The scene comes to a halt with a fatal accident. The rural Australian town of Paris arranges fatal accidents to visitors driving through. Townspeople collect items from the luggage of the deceased passengers whilst survivors are taken to the local hospital where they are given lobotomies with power tools and kept as "veggies" for medical experiments by the earnest town surgeon. The young men of the town salvage and modify the wrecked vehicles into a variety of strange-looking cars designed for destruction.

Arthur Waldo (Terry Camilleri) and his older brother, George Waldo (Rick Scully), drive through Paris with their caravan where they meet with an accident that kills George. Arthur is spared and looked after by the Mayor of Paris, Len Kelly (John Meillon), who invites Arthur to stay in his home as one of his family; his two young daughters have been "adopted" after being orphaned in motor accidents in the town.

Arthur unsuccessfully attempts to leave Paris but due to a previous incident where he was exonerated of manslaughter for running over an elderly pedestrian, he has lost his confidence in driving and there does not seem to be any public transport. Mayor Len gives Arthur a job at the local hospital as a medical orderly. Beneath the idyllic rural paradise of Paris is a festering feud between the young men of the town who live for their modified vehicles that they terrorise the town with and the older generation. When one of the hoons damages the Mayor's property and breaks a statue of an Aboriginal Australian the older men of the town burn the guilty driver's car as he is held down.

The Mayor appoints Arthur the town parking inspector complete with brassard and Army bush jacket that further irritates the young men. The situation reaches its boiling point the night of the town's annual Pioneers Ball which is a fancy dress and costume party.  What was planned to be a "car gymkhana" by the young men turns into an assault on the town where both sides attack each other killing several of the residents.  Arthur regains his driving confidence when he repeatedly drives the Mayor's car into his former hospital orderly supervisor who is one of the hoons. The film closes with Arthur, and the town's other residents, leaving Paris in the night.

Cast
 John Meillon as Mayor Len Kelly
 Terry Camilleri as Arthur Waldo
 Chris Haywood as Darryl
 Bruce Spence as Charlie
 Kevin Miles as Dr. Midland
 Rick Scully as George Waldo
 Max Gillies as Metcalfe
 Peter Armstrong as Gorman
 Joe Burrow as Ganger
 Deryck Barnes as Al Smedley
 Edward Howell as Tringham
 Jack Ellerton as Staring Drinker
 Max Phipps as Reverend Mulray
 Melissa Jaffer as Beth

Production
Peter Weir got the idea to make the film while driving through Europe where road signs on the main French roads diverted him into what he perceived as strange little villages. It originally started as a comedy to star Grahame Bond but later evolved. Piers Davies and Keith Gow also had input. He then took the movie to the McElroy brothers, who had previously worked in a large variety of positions on a number of films. Most of the budget came from the Australian Film Development Corporation with additional funds from Royce Smeal Film Productions in Sydney. Shooting began in October 1973, primarily on location in Sofala, New South Wales.

Release
The producers unsuccessfully attempted to negotiate an American release for the film with Roger Corman after it was shown with great success at the Cannes Film Festival. Shortly afterwards Corman recruited Paul Bartel to direct his Death Race 2000; Bartel had not seen The Cars That Ate Paris but he was aware that Corman had a print of the film.

The movie struggled to find an audience in Australia, changing distributors and using ad campaigns that pitched it alternately as a horror film and an art film. However it has become a cult film. By 1980, $112,500 had been returned to the producers. It received an American release in 1976 by New Line Cinema under the title The Cars That Eat People with added on narration and other changes.

In 1992, it was adapted as a musical theater work by Chamber Made Opera.

Legendary director Stanley Kubrick included The Cars That Ate Paris on the list of his 93 favourite films.

Reception
, the film holds a 60% "Fresh" rating on Rotten Tomatoes out of 15 reviews.

See also
 Cinema of Australia

Further reading
 Gordon Glenn & Scott Murray, "Production Report: The Cars That Ate Paris", Cinema Papers, January 1974 pp. 18–26

References

External links
 
 
 
 
 The Cars That Ate Paris at Australian National Film and Sound Archive
 The Cars That Ate Paris at Oz Movies

 

1974 films
1974 horror films
1970s comedy horror films 
Australian horror films 
Films directed by Peter Weir
Australian black comedy films 
Films set in Australia
Films shot in New South Wales
Australian independent films
Films scored by Bruce Smeaton
American comedy-drama films
Films about automobiles
1974 directorial debut films
1974 comedy films
1970s English-language films
1970s American films